A. Senapathi Gounder (9 September 1916 – 25 February 1992) was an Indian politician, former Member of Parliament India and Member of the Legislative Assembly of Tamil Nadu.

He was elected to the Palani Lok Sabha constituency as a member of the Indian National Congress party for four consecutive times (1980, 1984, 1989 and 1991), his last term ending with his death. He was elected to the Tamil Nadu Legislative Assembly for four terms,  from Dharapuram constituency in 1952 and 1957; Oddanchatram constituency in 1962 and Kangayam constituency in 1967.

References 

1916 births
1992 deaths
Indian National Congress politicians from Tamil Nadu
Members of the Tamil Nadu Legislative Assembly
India MPs 1980–1984
India MPs 1984–1989
India MPs 1989–1991
Lok Sabha members from Tamil Nadu
India MPs 1991–1996
People from Dindigul district